Robert Connor (13 October 1922 − October 2002) was an English professional footballer who played as a goalkeeper.

Career
Born in Bradford, Connor played for Salts, Bradford City, Wrexham and Bath City.

He played for Bradford City between September 1949 and July 1951, making 28 appearances in the Football League and 2 appearances in the FA Cup for them.

Sources

References

1922 births
2002 deaths
English footballers
Salts F.C. players
Bradford City A.F.C. players
Wrexham A.F.C. players
Bath City F.C. players
English Football League players
Association football goalkeepers